Shotmed Paper Industries (spi) is one of the first privately established bond paper mills in Egypt. Shotmed Paper Industries is an industry of Shotmed Company. Besides the Hadera Mill in Israel, it is the only paper mill in the Middle East that produces wood-free paper from wood pulp.

History
Shotmed Paper Industries purchased two mills from an unnamed seller in the United States in 2005. They transported them to 6th of October City, Egypt and Paper Machine 1 began production of salable paper by December 2007, producing 15,000 tons/year. Paper Machine 2 began production of 15,000 tons/year in April 2008.

References

See also
List of paper mills

Pulp and paper mills in Egypt
Manufacturing companies established in 2005
Manufacturing companies of Egypt
Egyptian companies established in 2005
6th of October (city)